Callicarpenal is a terpenoid that has been isolated from plants of the genus Callicarpa (beautyberry).  It acts as an insect repellent against mosquitoes (Aedes aegypti and Anopheles stephensi) and fire ants.  It also has activity against ticks (Ixodes scapularis and Amblyomma americanum).

In comparison to the most commonly used insect repellent, DEET, callicarpenal is only about 21% less effective at preventing mosquito bites.

Callicarpenal was discovered by scientists at the United States Department of Agriculture's Agricultural Research Service who were inspired by reports that Callicarpa americana (American beautyberry) was used as a folk remedy to prevent mosquito bites.

References

External links
 

Terpenes and terpenoids
Aldehydes
Insect repellents